Deh-e Aqa or Deh Aqa may refer to:

Deh Aqa, Kurdistan
Deh-e Aqa, Lorestan
Deh-e Aqa, Saveh, Markazi Province
Deh-e Aqa, Shazand, Markazi Province